Natalie Simone Rickli (born 19 November 1976 in Winterthur, Switzerland) is a Swiss politician of the Swiss People's Party.

Biography 
Rickli started her professional career in the publishing business. She then moved to the advertising industry, where she marketed print products and websites for sports, Weltwoche, PCtipp and Computerworld, among others. She worked at the former Qualiclick AG in Zollikon as a website manager, then at the publishing house IDG as head of advertising administration and marketing, later at AdLINK Schweiz AG as site relations manager, she switched to IP Multimedia (Switzerland) AG  in 2009. Rickli was elected as member of the National Council of Switzerland from the Canton of Zürich in 2007. She was part of the World Economic Forum's 2013 Young Leadership program. In March 2019, she was elected to the Executive Council of Zürich and appointed as the Director of Health.

Rickli is a member of a Campaign for an Independent and Neutral Switzerland.

In 2014, a rap group composed a song that targeted Rickli with sexually charged lyrics. The group was prosecuted in Zürich and found guilty of defamation and abuse. That verdict was upheld by the cantonal court. The courts, however, found that the rappers were not guilty of sexual harassment in the grounds that Rickli did not listen to the song. A victim of harassment would have to be present to hear the abuse. The case was later sent to the federal courts, which also acquitted in the charge of sexual harassment.

References

1976 births
Living people
Members of the National Council (Switzerland)
Swiss People's Party politicians
Campaign for an Independent and Neutral Switzerland
Women members of the National Council (Switzerland)
21st-century Swiss women politicians
21st-century Swiss politicians